Oak Avenue Intermediate School is a two-year public intermediate, junior high, or middle school, located in Temple City, California, in the west San Gabriel Valley.

History
The Temple City Unified School District was established on July 1, 1954 and incorporated Oak Avenue Intermediate School, formerly part of the Pasadena Unified School District. Before 1956, Temple City public school students would attend Pasadena High School after Oak Avenue, but in 1956 the first 12th grade class in the district graduated at Oak Avenue.

Teachers

The principal is Mr. Lessem who recently moved to the school during the 21-22 school year. 
The vice principal is Mrs. Goold.

Notable teachers for the 7th grade include Mrs. Arrighi ( English ), Mr. Loomis ( History ), Mrs. Chen ( Math ), and Mr. Folsom ( PE ).
Notable teachers for the 8th grade include Ms. Ho ( English ), Mr. Hart ( History ), Ms. Kasuyama ( Math ), and Mr. Aguirre ( PE ).

Electives
Students at Oak Avenue must take Mathematics, English, Social Studies, Science, and Physical Education for the full two years, but may choose an elective class. Typical elective classes include Beginning and Advanced Art, Auxiliaries, Computers and Computer Graphics, Film Studies, Media Literacy, Marching Band, Orchestra, Chorus, Yearbook, and STEAM.

Performing arts
Oak Avenue's music program offers two departments; band, consisting woodwind instruments, such as the flute, piccolo, clarinet, bass clarinet, oboe, bassoon, saxophone (including alto, tenor, and baritone), the brass instruments: trumpet, French horn, trombone, tuba, baritone and percussion instruments starting at the Intermediate level (see below); while orchestra consists of strings, such as violin, viola, cello, and bass—a symphony orchestra, in contrast, combines winds, percussions, and strings into a single body. The band and orchestra manage to combine once every year to form a symphony orchestra in able to play a specific song to the entire school.

Both departments have three levels of proficiency; beginning, intermediate, and advanced. The advanced band is given the further sobriquet of "Royals Concert Band". Each year the departments participate in different events. The Royals Band, for example, marches in various parades throughout the school's second semester.

Clubs
Clubs include the Young Activist Club, Asian Culture Club, Builders Club, Calligraphy Club, JSA, L.I.F.E Club, Math Club, Odyssey of the Mind, Royal Readers, Rubik's Cube Club, Science Olympiad, Teen Advisory, Unidos Club, and WEB.

Young Activist Club 
The Activist Club is to unite the student body, educate on issues locally and nationally, and fundraise for important causes.

Asian Culture Club 
The Asian Culture Club celebrates Asian culture by viewing Asian television shows, movies, music, and art.

Builders Club 
The Builders Club is a community service-based organization where the objectives are to provide opportunities for working together in service to the school and community, to develop leadership potential, to foster the development of strong moral character, and to encourage loyalty to the school, community, and nation.

Calligraphy Club 
This student-led organization aims to help spread an understanding and love of calligraphy. Students learn technique and performance exercises to perfect their calligraphy.

JSA 
JSA is a political club to teach students debate and public speaking skills by providing students a safe forum to discuss important issues and ideas while teaching respect for opposing views.

L.I.F.E Club 
LIFE is an acronym for Living in Faith Everyday and is a Christian based club, which offers something for everyone regardless of background. Some events are faith-based such as Bon Fire nights, a few concerts, devotionals, and Christmas caroling. Some events are strictly social for providing an environment where everyone can belong such as attending a K-pop concert, an Escape room, hiking, riding bikes to the beach, ice skating, or spending a day discovering LA.

Distinguished School Award
The Temple City Unified School District is recognized as "A District of Distinguished Schools" as all the public schools have been awarded the Distinguished School Award by the California Department of Education, placing each awarded school in the top five percent of California's public schools in the given year.

Oak Avenue Intermediate School (grades 7–8) and Temple City High School (grades 9–12), received the award in 1996 just a year after 
Cloverly Elementary School (grades 4–6) was the first to receive the award, in 1995. One year later, in 1997, both Emperor Elementary School (grades K–6) and La Rosa Elementary School (grades K–3) received the award, followed by Longden Elementary School (grades K–6) in 2004.

Differentiated staffing
Differentiated staffing has been successfully implemented at Oak Avenue to such an extent that it has been used as an example in Differentiated Staffing in Schools. A Review of Current Policies and Programs by Joseph Stocker (published by National School Public Relations Assn., 1201 16th Street, N.W. Washington, D.C. 20036).

Promotion Requirements 
In order to promote to Temple City High School, or any other high school, a student of Oak Avenue must not have more than two failing grades for a class. If they received more than two failing grades in one year, then they will not promote to high school and might have to repeat 8th grade in the Junior Academy.

References

External links
 Oak Avenue Intermediate School website
 Oak Avenue Intermediate School Staff Directory website
 Temple City Unified School District website
 SCSBOA.org

Temple City Unified School District schools
Middle schools in California
Schools in Los Angeles County, California
Educational institutions established in 1954
1954 establishments in California